Natain is a village located in Dina Tehsil of Jhelum District in the province of Punjab, Pakistan. It is about 8.5 km away from the town of Dina and 25 km away from Jhelum City. The village is one of many villages surrounding Dina town. The village is located 32°59'53"N and 73°32'2"E and has an altitude of 275 metres (905 ft). It consists mainly of large crop fields of the residents.

Populated places in Jhelum District